Cotton Hall is a Grade II listed stately home in the village of Kedington, Suffolk, England. It is located on the banks of the River Stour and is one of the ancient notable manor houses in the parish. From 1742 it was the residence of the Bowyer family of Suffolk. The present building is a timber-frame and plaster structure estimated to be built between the 15th and 17th centuries. It was heavily restored in the 20th century.

History

There is mention of the hall in 'The Calendar of Inquisitions Post-Mortem' from the reign of Edward II, indicating the existence of a profitable estate in the 14th century. In 1734, Hitch Wale, the uncle of Sir Charles Wale stayed at the hall. The Suffolk newspaper the Ipswich Journal describes the estate in a publication of July 10, 1742 as "a good dairy farm called Cotton Hall consisting of 270 acres of meadow, pasture and plow with new house upon it, barns, stables, neat houses". The 1742 change of hand, when the estate came into the possession of the Bowyer family, was organised by the local Baron Prettyman. In 1896, the will of William Bowyer states that his personal estate was valued at £11,637 (equivalent to £1,583,180 in 2020). At some point before 1896 the Bowyer family acquired Church Farm, in nearby Clare, also a frequent meet location for Suffolk foxhunting. The current property, retaining stables and outbuildings, was last on the public market in 2005 and is now a private residence.

See also
 St Peter and St Paul's Church, Clare

External links
 The Foxearth and District Local History Society. Home page

References

Grade II listed houses in Suffolk